This is a list of all (former) Member of the European Parliament for the Party for Freedom (PVV) from 2009.

Source:

Seats in the European Parliament

Alphabetical
Current members of the European Parliament are in bold.
(period is the time they represented the Party for Freedom in the European Parliament.)

European Parliament periods

2009-2014 

4 Seats:(5 seats from 9 October 2011) 
 Barry Madlener(top candidate) (replaced by Patricia van der Kammen) 
 Louis Bontes(replaced by Lucas Hartong) 
 Daniël van der Stoep(replaced by Auke Zijlstra) 
 Laurence Stassen
 Lucas Hartong
 Patricia van der Kammen
 Auke Zijlstra
From 9 October 2011
 Daniël van der Stoep

2014-2019 

4 Seats:
 Marcel de Graaff(top candidate)
 Vicky Maeijer(replaced by: André Elissen) 
 Olaf Stuger
 Hans Jansen(replaced by: Auke Zijlstra) 
 Auke Zijlstra
 André Elissen

2019-2024 

0 Seats:

References

Main